Euphaedra calliope is a butterfly species in the family Nymphalidae. It is found in Cameroon.

Subspecies
Euphaedra calliope calliope (Cameroon)
Euphaedra calliope aurichalca Hecq, 1981 (Cameroon)

References

Butterflies described in 1981
calliope
Endemic fauna of Cameroon
Butterflies of Africa